State Route 149 (SR 149) is a primary state highway in the U.S. state of Virginia.  Known as Princess Anne Road, the state highway runs  from SR 165 east to a point near the intersection of Princess Anne Road and General Booth Boulevard within the independent city of Virginia Beach.

Route description

SR 149 begins in the Princess Anne section of the city of Virginia Beach, which contains the city offices and courthouse, a vestige of when the community was the county seat of Princess Anne County.  SR 165 heads northwest as Princess Anne Road toward the city of Norfolk and southwest as North Landing Road toward the city of Chesapeake.  SR 149 heads east as a two-lane undivided road that passes by a residential subdivision and through a swampy area where the highway crosses West Neck Creek.  The state highway enters a suburban residential area shortly before reaching its terminus at an indeterminate point just west of where Princess Anne Road expands to a four-lane divided highway.  Princess Anne Road turns south toward Knotts Island, North Carolina at the following intersection with General Booth Boulevard in the community of Nimmo.  General Booth Boulevard heads northeast toward the Virginia Beach Oceanfront.

Major intersections

References

External links

Virginia Highways Project: VA 149

149
State Route 149